Vozdvizhenye is a rural locality (a village) in Kubenskoye Rural Settlement, Vologodsky District, Vologda Oblast, Russia. The population was 26 as of 2002.

Geography 
Vozdvizhenye is located 38 km northwest of Vologda (the district's administrative centre) by road. Staroye Selo is the nearest rural locality.

References 

Rural localities in Vologodsky District